This is a list of Dundee F.C. managers and all those who have held the position of manager of the first team of Dundee, since its formation in 1893. The club have had 34 permanent managers, with Jocky Scott holding the position three times and both Sandy MacFarlane and Jim Duffy holding it twice.

Managers
Information correct as of matches played 18 March 2023.

Key to record:
 P = Matches played
 W = Matches won
 D = Matches drawn
 L = Matches lost
 Win % = Win ratio

Key to honours:
 LG = Scottish league
 FA = Scottish Cup
 LC = Scottish League Cup
 L1 = Scottish second tier
 CC = Scottish Challenge Cup

References

Bibliography

External links 
 Dundee F.C. website - history

Dundee
Dundee F.C. managers
Managers
Managers